Lowell Dean is a Canadian filmmaker.

He has directed four feature films: the zombie thriller 13 Eerie (2013), the horror comedy WolfCop (2014), the sequel Another WolfCop (2017) and the post-apocalypse action film SuperGrid (2018). Lowell also wrote WolfCop, released June 2014 in Canadian Cineplex theatres. In an Interview with Bloody Disgusting in March 2015, Dean revealed he was writing the sequel to WolfCop, which would again star Leo Fafard in the lead.

Dean's television projects include the children's series Hi Opie! produced by The Jim Henson Company, and the Canadian reality series Dust Up produced by Paperny Entertainment.

References

External links
 
 

Film directors from Saskatchewan
Living people
Canadian male screenwriters
Horror film directors
Year of birth uncertain
Place of birth missing (living people)
Year of birth missing (living people)
21st-century Canadian screenwriters
21st-century Canadian male writers